Paixão may refer to:
 Paixão (TV series), a 2017–2018 Portuguese telenovela
 Paixão (film), a 2012 Portuguese film

People with the given name
 Paixão Afonso (born 1991), Angolan Olympic sailor

People with the surname
 Jorge Paixão (born 1965), Portuguese footballer and manager
 Bruno Paixão (born 1974), Portuguese football referee
 Fredson Paixão (born 1979), Brazilian martial artist
 Flávio Paixão (born 1984), Portuguese footballer
 Marco Paixão (born 1984), Portuguese footballer
 Liliana Paixão (born 1988), Angolan handball player
 Tainá Paixão (born 1991), Brazilian basketball player
 Luana Paixão (born 1993), Brazilian footballer
 Lucas Paixão (born 1994), Brazilian field hockey player
 Igor Paixão (born 2000), Brazilian footballer